Cyperus myrmecias is a species of sedge that is native to parts of tropical parts of southern Africa.

See also 
 List of Cyperus species

References 

myrmecias
Plants described in 1884
Flora of Zambia
Flora of Angola
Flora of Zimbabwe
Taxa named by Henry Nicholas Ridley